Me muero por ti, was an American telenovela produced by Rubicon Entertainment for Telemundo in 1999.

Cast 

 Christian Meier as Alfonso Hidalgo
 Bárbara Mori as Santa
 Alejandra Borrero as Julia
 Isabella Santodomingo as Kathy
 Mara Croatto as Helena
 Jorge Martínez as Don Felipe Rodríguez
 Zully Montero as Margot Hidalgo
 Raúl Xiques as Lorenzo
 Marisol Calero as Jasmina
 Luis Mesa as Luciano
 Maricella González as Fefa
 Carlos Mantilla as Óscar
 Laura Termini as Laura
 Pedro Telémaco as Vicente
 Jonny Nessi as Mark
 Liz Colenadro as Tina
 Jetzabel Montero as Carmen
 Vicente Pasarielo as Darío
 Gloria Kennedy as Sara
 Eduardo Ibarrola
 Irán Daniels as Margarita
 Alexandra Rozo Navarro as Alexandra
 José Capote as Carlos
 Griselda Noguera as Petra
 Sergio Meyer as Rafael
 María Corina Marrero as Clara

External links 
 

Telemundo telenovelas
1999 telenovelas